Paul Albert Collins (July 22, 1926 – January 31, 1995) was a long-distance runner from Canada, who was born in the London Borough of Lewisham. He represented his native country in the men's marathon at the 1952 Summer Olympics in Helsinki, Finland. There he finished in 40th place.

Collins won the national title in the classic distance three times: in 1949 (Toronto), 1950 (Verdun, Quebec) and 1952 (Saint Hyacinthe). He finished sixth in the 1950 British Empire Games marathon and tenth in the 1950 British Empire Games six miles event.

Achievements

References
 Canadian Olympic Committee
 sports-reference

1926 births
1995 deaths
People from the London Borough of Lewisham
Athletes from London
Canadian male long-distance runners
Athletes (track and field) at the 1952 Summer Olympics
Olympic track and field athletes of Canada
Athletes (track and field) at the 1950 British Empire Games
Commonwealth Games competitors for Canada
English emigrants to Canada